On Immunity: An Inoculation is a nonfiction book by Eula Biss published by Graywolf Press in 2014. It is primarily about vaccination of children.  Bill Gates endorsed it on Twitter, saying "On Immunity is a great book that is not out to demonize anyone who holds opposing views." Literary Review described the book as "vital and passionate, at times maddening, always fascinating."

Awards and honors
2014 New York Times Best Books of the Year, one of "10 Best Books".
2014 National Book Critics Circle Award (Criticism), finalist.
2015 Mark Zuckerberg book club selection February.

References

Further reading
 Benjamin H. Chin-Yee, "Vaccination and Its Discontents: Review of On Immunity by Eula Biss", University of Toronto Medical Journal, Vol. 92, No. 3 (2015)

External links
  (recorded on October 25, 2014)
  (recorded in November 2014)

Books about health
Graywolf Press books
Vaccines